Robert Biedroń (born 13 April 1976) is a Polish politician,  former mayor of Słupsk, and LGBT activist who has been serving as a Member of the European Parliament since 2019.

Biedroń was a member of the Sejm during its 7th session (2011–2014). He's also a former member of the Parliamentary Assembly of the Council of Europe and the Congress of Local and Regional Authorities of the Council of Europe. He was mayor of Słupsk from 2014 to 2018.

Biedroń launched a new political party called Spring in February 2019, and was elected a Member of the European Parliament on his party's list on 26 May 2019. He is one of the three leaders of The Left (Lewica), a political alliance founded to contest the 2019 parliamentary election composed of the Democratic Left Alliance (SLD), Spring and the Left Together (Lewica Razem).

He ran as a candidate for president of Poland in the 2020 election and received 2.21 percent of all votes, making him the sixth most popular candidate.

Early life and education 
Biedroń was born on 13 April 1976 in Rymanów, in Podkarpackie Voivodeship. He grew up in Krosno.

Biedroń completed his secondary education in Ustrzyki Dolne. He received a bachelor in political science at the University of Warmia and Mazury in Olsztyn (2000). He received a master's degree in the same field in 2003. He also is a graduate of the School of Political and Social Leaders and the School of Human Rights at the Helsinki Human Rights Foundation.

Biedroń speaks English, French, Russian, Esperanto and Italian.

Activism 
Biedroń has co-operated with Polish and international LGBT rights organizations for many years. Following his studies, he travelled to London and joined the British NGO OutRage!.

Biedroń participated in the first Gay Pride ever organized in Poland on 1 May 2001. In September 2001, he co-founded the Polish Campaign Against Homophobia (Kampania Przeciw Homofobii).

Biedroń's commitment to LGBT rights has been recognized several times: he received, for instance, the "Rainbow Laurels" in 2003 and was named "Rainbow Man" in 2004.

Faithful to Your Movement's values, to social liberalism, secularism and a Europhile vision of the EU; he advocates for a separation of church and state in practice and not just in words, for the removal of catechism classes from public schools, he supports feminism (notably the right to abortion for all women), same-sex marriages in Poland, free access to contraception and sexual education.

Biedroń founded the Institute for Democratic Thought (Instytut Myśli Demokratycznej), a progressive think-tank which conducted a program entitled Scenarios for Poland. The Institute analysed the possible evolutions of the country in the next 20 years and formulated policy recommendations. Robert Biedroń has also built the Progressive Cities''' network – a platform of cities' cooperation and good practice exchange aimed at supporting local, progressive politics based on participatory democracy, transparency and an open local community.

Biedroń is the author of several books, notably a handbook on the functioning of a democracy for children Turn Democracy On (Włącz Demokrację), his autobiography Against the current (Pod prąd) and a book entitled New Chapter (Nowy rozdział) which contains his political reflections, published a few months before the launch of his political party.

 Political career 

 Early political career (2005–2014) 
In 2005, Biedroń was an unsuccessful Democratic Left Alliance (SLD) candidate for the Sejm, the lower house of the Polish parliament. In the October 2011 parliamentary elections, Biedroń was elected to the Sejm as a candidate of Palikot Movement, receiving 16,919 votes in the Gdynia district. He was the first openly gay member of the Sejm. He has been a victim of homophobic aggression, having been attacked physically several times since his election.

 Member of the Sejm (2011–2014) 
During his term as a member of the Sejm, Biedrón served as vice-president of the Committee on Legal Affairs and Human Rights and member of the Committee on Foreign Affairs.

In addition to his parliamentary work, Biedroń was a member of the Polish delegation to the Parliamentary Assembly of the Council of Europe from 2012 to 2015.

 Mayor of Słupsk (2014–2018) 
Biedroń ran in the mayoral elections in Słupsk in 2014, a city of around 95,000 inhabitants located in the Pomeranian Voivodeship. He secured 57% of the vote in the second round. He thus became the first openly gay mayor ever in Poland.

Once elected mayor of Słupsk, Biedroń pursued an austerity policy. Indeed, the city was heavily indebted, with a total debt of 300 million zlotys, when he took up office. He decided for instance to waive his official car, he requested to the City Council to lower his wage and he closed several local agencies. In 2017, the total debt of Słupsk decreased to 232 million zlotys.

During his term, Biedroń carried out a pro-ecological, egalitarian policy with some elements of participatory democracy. The city realized the thermo-modernisation of public buildings. The mayor initiated the « Red Couch » – a red couch was placed in public areas to talk with the constituents. He has also created some consultative bodies, such as the Sustainable Development Council, the Women's Council and the Seniors' Council. He refused to host a circus with wild animals and opened a new animal shelter in Słupsk.

As mayor, Biedroń belonged to the Congress of Local and Regional Authorities of the Council of Europe from 2015 to 2018. Besides this, he was a member of the Advisory Group on Gender, Forced Displacement and Protection created by the United Nations High Commissioner for Refugees (UNHCR).

Biedrón did not run again in the mayoral elections in 2018, but he supported his deputy mayor Krystyna Danilecka-Wojewódzka.

 Leadership of Spring (2019–present) 

On 4 September 2018, Biedroń launched what he termed a "pro-democratic" political movement aimed at challenging the ruling Law and Justice party. He then launched the "Brainstormings with Biedroń", a series of events aimed at discussing about the future of Poland. Each "Brainstorming" was conducted by Biedroń and attracted hundreds, sometimes thousands, of people.

In December, he announced the first goals of his yet unnamed party: shutting down all coal mines in Poland by 2035, improving the health care system and ending state subsidies to the church.

In February 2019, Biedroń founded a new political party called Spring (Polish: Wiosna), He intends to build an alternative to the conservative Law and Justice vs. liberal Civic Platform political duopoly. Spring won 6,1% of the votes in the European elections and Robert Biedroń was elected a Member of the European Parliament on his party's list on 26 May 2019.

Before the parliamentary election in October 2019, he co-founded The Left (Lewica), a political alliance composed of the Democratic Left Alliance (SLD), Spring and the Left Together (Lewica Razem). He is one of The Left's three leaders. In January 2020 Robert Biedron was chosen by this alliance as the candidate or the left for the 2020 présidential election. The election was planned for 10 May 2020, but was postponed.

 Member of European Parliament (2019–present) 
Once elected to the European Parliament, he has since been serving on the Committee on Budgets and the Committee on Women's Rights and Gender Equality. He chairs the delegation for relations with Belarus and is a member of the delegation for relations with Canada. He belongs to the group of the Progressive Alliance of Socialists and Democrats (S&D).

 2020 presidential election 

In January 2020, his candidacy received the support of the Democratic Left Alliance, Left Together and Spring, which jointly issued him in the presidential election in the same year. He was also supported by the Polish Socialist Party.

 Political positions 
After the Supreme Court of Poland ruled in 2020 that abortions in cases of foetal defects are unconstitutional, Biedroń called on the European Commission to "widen the scope" of Article 7 of the Treaty on European Union — which at present is limited to concerns over the judiciary — to women's rights.

 Personal life 
Biedroń's life partner is Krzysztof Śmiszek, member of the Sejm, doctor of law, activist in the Campaign Against Homophobia and board chairman of the Polish Society of Anti-Discrimination Law.

He identifies as an atheist.

 In popular culture 
Biedroń is the subject of a documentary by Paul Szynol called Biedroń: Unfinished''. The film was cut as a short because Biedroń backed out of the project for fear that it would hurt him politically.

Awards 
Biedroń received the French National Order of Merit on 20 July 2016.

References

External links
  Official site

1976 births
Democratic Left Alliance politicians
Gay politicians
LGBT mayors
Polish LGBT politicians
LGBT MEPs for Poland
Polish LGBT rights activists
Living people
People from Krosno
Polish atheists
Members of the Polish Sejm 2011–2015
Mayors of places in Poland
Your Movement politicians
People from Rymanów
MEPs for Poland 2019–2024
Candidates in the 2020 Polish presidential election
University of Warmia and Mazury in Olsztyn alumni